Ernst Stöckl (26 May 1912 — 22 March 2000) was an Austrian chess player.

Biography
From the second half of the 1950s until the mid-1960s, Ernst Stöckl was one of the strongest chess players in Austria. He was the participant of traditional chess tournaments held in Austria: Leopold Trebitsch Memorial Tournament, Carl Schlechter Memorial Tournament and others.

Ernst Stöckl played for Austria in the Chess Olympiads:
 In 1958, at third board in the 13th Chess Olympiad in Munich (+5, =4, -4),
 In 1964, at reserve board in the 16th Chess Olympiad in Tel Aviv (+2, =2, -3).

Ernst Stöckl played for Austria in the European Team Chess Championship preliminaries:
 In 1957, at seventh board in the 1st European Team Chess Championship preliminaries (+0, =1, -1),
 In 1965, at third board in the 3rd European Team Chess Championship preliminaries (+0, =2, -2).

Also Ernst Stöckl four time participated in Clare Benedict Chess Cup and in team competition won gold (1961) and bronze (1959) medals.

References

External links

Ernst Stöckl chess games at 365chess.com

1912 births
2000 deaths
Austrian chess players
Chess Olympiad competitors
20th-century chess players